Beau Landry (born September 24, 1991) is a Canadian football linebacker. He was drafted by the Hamilton Tiger-Cats with the eighth overall pick in the 2014 CFL Draft. He played CIS football at the University of Western Ontario.

College career
Landry played from 2010 to 2013 for the Western Mustangs. He recorded a total of 130.5 defensive tackles, six quarterback sacks, four interceptions, five forced fumbles and three fumble recoveries with the Mustangs. He was a first-team OUA All-Star and first-team All-Canadian in 2013. Landry was also a first-team OUA All-Star and first-team All-Canadian in 2011. He participated in the 2013 CIS East-West Bowl as a member of the West team.

Professional career

Hamilton Tiger-Cats
Landry was drafted by the Hamilton Tiger-Cats in the first round of the 2014 CFL Draft. He was ranked No. 15 in the final CFL Scouting Bureau rankings in April 2014.

Calgary Stampeders
Landry signed with the Calgary Stampeders on February 15, 2017. He was released on August 24, 2017, never appearing in a game for the Stampeders.

Saskatchewan Roughriders
On August 29, 2017, Landry signed to the practice roster of the Saskatchewan Roughriders.

References

External links
Hamilton Tiger-Cats profile
Western Mustangs profile

Living people
1991 births
Canadian football linebackers
Western Mustangs football players
Hamilton Tiger-Cats players
Calgary Stampeders players
Saskatchewan Roughriders players
Players of Canadian football from Ontario
Sportspeople from Kitchener, Ontario